The Jefferson Muzzle Awards are an award given in the United States by the Thomas Jefferson Center for the Protection of Free Expression to people who are perceived to undermine freedom of speech. The award categories are:  Censorship of Students, Censorship by Students, Efforts to Limit Press Access on Campus, Threats to Academic Freedom and Silencing of Outside Speakers. 

For the first time in 25 years, the Jefferson Center expanded anti-free speech awards to 50 recipients, the 2016 award is also unique in the aspect that all of the recipients are colleges.  “Never in our 25 years of awarding the Jefferson Muzzles have we observed such an alarming concentration of anti-speech activity as we saw last year on college campuses across the country.”

Conversely, the Jefferson Center commended the University of Chicago, American University, Purdue and Princeton University for issuing “broadest possible latitude” statements concerning speech policy on their campuses.  

The 2018 Jefferson Muzzle Awards

 Herriman High School
 Kearny High School (Missouri)
 U.S. Capitol Police
 Windfern High School Principal Martha Strother
 Starkville, Mississippi Board of Aldermen
 Oregon State Board of Examiners for Engineering and Land Surveying
 Parkway High School Principal Waylon Bates

The 2017 Jefferson Muzzle Awards

 The administration of Boca Raton Community High School
 The State Government of Illinois
 The California State Legislature and Governor Jerry Brown
 Florida's Collier County School District
 The United States Senate
 Bradley County (Tennessee) Sheriff Eric Watson
 The United States Olympic Committee 
 The Pierce College Administration and the Los Angeles Community College

The 2016 Jefferson Muzzle Awards

See also

William O. Douglas Prize

References

Free expression awards
Ironic and humorous awards
Freedom of speech in the United States